Camille "Bud" George (December 23, 1927 – September 1, 2017) was an American politician.

Biography
Born in Houtzdale, Pennsylvania on December 23, 1927, George graduated from Houtzdale High School in 1944, and then served in the United States Navy during World War II. 

After serving as mayor of Houtzdale, George was elected to the Pennsylvania House of Representatives, where he represented his constituents from 1974 until 2012. He was a Democrat. 

In a 2002 PoliticsPA feature story designating politicians with yearbook superlatives, he was named the "Toughest to Work For."

Death
George died in Houtzdale, Pennsylvania on September 1, 2017.

References

External links
Pennsylvania House of Representatives - Camille George (Democrat) official PA House website
Pennsylvania House Democratic Caucus - Camille George official Party website

1927 births
2017 deaths
United States Navy personnel of World War II
People from Clearfield County, Pennsylvania
Military personnel from Pennsylvania
Mayors of places in Pennsylvania
Democratic Party members of the Pennsylvania House of Representatives
21st-century American politicians